The men's sanda 60 kg competition at the 2017 Summer Universiade was held between August 26 and August 29, 2017, at the Hsinchu County Gym, Hsinchu County, Taiwan.

Schedule

Results

References

Wushu at the Summer Universiade